The Fuzion 100 Southsea Trophy, previously named the Aegon Southsea Trophy, was a tennis tournament held on outdoor grass courts at Canoe Lake in Southsea, United Kingdom. It was held from 2017 to 2018 and was part of the ITF Women's Circuit as a $100,000+H event.

Past finals

Singles

Doubles

External links 
 

ITF Women's World Tennis Tour
Grass court tennis tournaments
Tennis tournaments in England
Recurring sporting events established in 2017
Recurring sporting events disestablished in 2018
Defunct tennis tournaments in the United Kingdom
Sport in Portsmouth